Sian Leah Beilock (born January 10, 1976) is a cognitive scientist who is the eighth president of Barnard College and president-elect of Dartmouth College. Previous to serving at Barnard College, President Beilock spent 12 years at the University of Chicago, departing as the Stella M. Rowley Professor of Psychology and Executive Vice Provost. She holds doctorates of philosophy in both kinesiology and psychology from Michigan State University.

Education
Beilock graduated from the University of California, San Diego, where she received a B.S. in Cognitive Science with a minor in Psychology. She was awarded a Doctor of Philosophy (Ph.D.) from Michigan State University in 2003.

Career

During and subsequent to her PhD research, Beilock explored differences between novice and expert athletic performances.

Later in her career, Beilock's research focused on why people perform poorly in stressful academic situations, such as taking a high-stakes mathematics exam. Beilock found that worries during those situations rob individuals of the working memory or cognitive horsepower they would normally have to focus. Because people with more working memory rely on their brainpower more, they can be affected to a greater extent in stressful academic situations.  Beilock's work demonstrated that stressful situations during tests might diminish meaningful differences between students that, under less-stressful situations, might exhibit greater differences in performance.

From 2003 to 2005, Beilock was an assistant professor in the Department of Psychology at Miami University. She was on the faculty at The University of Chicago from 2005 until 2017, where she was the Stella M. Rowley Professor of Psychology and Executive Vice Provost.[5]

On July 1, 2017, she became the 8th president of Barnard College.

On July 21, 2022, it was announced that Beilock will become the first woman ever to lead Dartmouth College in 2023.

Cognitive science and education

Beilock's research relates to educational practice and policy. Her work demonstrates that students' attitudes and anxieties (as well as those of their teachers) are critical to student success. In her work, she has developed simple psychological interventions to help people perform their best under stress.

Books

 Beilock, S. L. (2010). Choke: What the Secrets of the Brain Reveal about Getting It Right When You Have To. Simon & Schuster: Free Press.
 Beilock, S. L. (2015). How the Body Knows Its Mind: The Surprising Power of the Physical Environment to Influence How You Think and Feel. Simon & Schuster: Atria Books.

References

External links
Choke – Beilock’s Psychology Today Blog

Living people
American cognitive psychologists
Michigan State University alumni
University of California, San Diego alumni
Presidents of Barnard College
1976 births
American women scientists
Women heads of universities and colleges